Aleksandr Aleksandrovich Ilyin Jr. (born November 22, 1983) is a Russian theater and film actor, poet, singer and songwriter of the punk band "Plan of Lomonosov".

Biography
Aleksandr Ilyin Jr. was born in Moscow, Russian SFSR, Soviet Union (now Russia). Since 2010 is a singer and songwriter of the punk band "Plan of Lomonosov".

Personal life
in the family's father Aleksandr Ilyin actor, he is his son Aleksandr Ilyin Jr. He is the nephew of actor Vladimir Ilyin.

Filmography

External links 
 kino-teatr.ru
 

Living people
1983 births
Male actors from Moscow
Russian male television actors
Russian male film actors
Russian male stage actors
20th-century Russian male actors
21st-century Russian male actors
Russian male poets
21st-century Russian singers
21st-century Russian male singers